de Hotham is a surname. Notable people with the surname include:

 John de Hotham (died 1361), English medieval university chancellor 
 Thomas de Hotham, English medieval university chancellor

See also
 Hotham (disambiguation)